The Pete Lyles House is a historic home located at 302 Kentucky Route 348 in Symsonia, Kentucky. The house was built in 1865 following the conclusion of the Civil War. The house's design incorporates Italianate and Greek Revival features and was the first Italianate home in Graves County. The home is listed on the National Register of Historic Places.

References 

Houses on the National Register of Historic Places in Kentucky
Italianate architecture in Kentucky
Greek Revival houses in Kentucky
Houses in Graves County, Kentucky
National Register of Historic Places in Graves County, Kentucky
1865 establishments in Kentucky
Houses completed in 1865